Lyon's Restaurant was a chain of diner-style restaurants, similar to Denny's. Many Lyon's were in Northern California, with their corporate headquarters in Sacramento.

History
Lyon's was founded in San Francisco in about 1952 by Lyons Magnus which was a Wholesaler of Syrups at the time. In 1966, it was bought by Consolidated Foods Corporation which later became Sara Lee; the company sold the chain in a management buyout (MBO) in 1989. At the time of the MBO, Lyon's had 65 restaurants across California, Oregon and Nevada and a turnover of $100m.

Not all of their restaurants were in Northern California - circa 1968 there was at least one in Southern California at La Habra Fashion Square (now Denny's) corner of Beach & Imperial Highway. The building is almost unchanged, from the exterior other than paint, it became a Denny's possibly in the 1980s. Another Lyon's was photographed in Eugene, Oregon, in 1985. This site became a Chinese buffet restaurant catering to faculty and students at the University of Oregon.

After bankruptcy in February 1998, Lyon's was acquired by ICH, an Arby's franchisee.  In January 2001, ICH sold Lyon's to Amber's Pacific Restaurants Inc., a company of San Diego restaurant owner Amber Lao. APRI filed for Chapter 11 bankruptcy in October 2001, blaming the economic turndown at that time.

In 2002, Lyon's reorganized its 72 remaining restaurants.  It sold 35 to franchisees, closed 32, and kept five in Northern California.

The last Lyon's closed in Sacramento in March, 2012.

On April 25, 2015, a Lyon's opened in the old Tony Roma's at 4233 Moorpark Avenue in West San Jose. New Lyon's locations have also opened in Tracy and Stockton, California. As of 2017, the Lyon's locations in San Jose, Tracy and Stockton have permanently closed.

As of August 2022, Lyons has plant locations in Wisconsin, Kentucky, and California.

References

Restaurants in California
Restaurant franchises
Companies based in Sacramento, California
Restaurants established in 1952
Companies that filed for Chapter 11 bankruptcy in 1998
Companies that filed for Chapter 11 bankruptcy in 2001
Companies disestablished in 2012
1952 establishments in California